The 2022 Makarska International Championships, also known as Makarska Open hosted by Valamar, was a professional tennis tournament played on outdoor clay courts. It was the sixteenth edition of the tournament and part of the 2022 WTA 125 tournaments. The previous editions of the tournament were held in Bol as the Croatia Bol Ladies Open but in 2022, the event was relocated to Makarska which once hosted a WTA Tier-IV event in 1998. It took place from 31 May to 5 June 2022.

Singles main draw entrants

Seeds 

 1 Rankings as of 23 May 2022.

Other entrants 
The following players received a wildcard into the singles main draw:
  Dea Herdželaš
  Tena Lukas
  Antonia Ružić
  Tara Würth

The following players entered the singles main draw through qualification:
  Mariana Dražić
  Eri Hozumi
  Dalila Jakupović
  Ayline Samardžić

Withdrawals 
Before the tournament
  Anna Bondár → replaced by  Anastasia Gasanova
  Madison Brengle → replaced by  Linda Nosková
  Dalma Gálfi → replaced by  Wang Xiyu
  Beatriz Haddad Maia → replaced by  Réka Luca Jani
  Marta Kostyuk → replaced by  Viktoriya Tomova
  Kristína Kučová → replaced by  Olga Danilović
  Kristina Mladenovic → replaced by  Anastasia Tikhonova
  Nuria Párrizas Díaz → replaced by  Jule Niemeier
  Rebecca Peterson → replaced by  Ekaterine Gorgodze
  Arantxa Rus → replaced by  Elisabetta Cocciaretto
  Mayar Sherif → replaced by  Aleksandra Krunić
  Martina Trevisan → replaced by  Elina Avanesyan
  Maryna Zanevska → replaced by  Astra Sharma
  Zheng Qinwen → replaced by  Julia Grabher

Doubles entrants

Seeds 

 1 Rankings as of 23 May 2022.

Champions

Singles

  Jule Niemeier def.  Elisabetta Cocciaretto 7–5, 6–1

Doubles

  Dalila Jakupović /  Tena Lukas def.  Olga Danilović /  Aleksandra Krunić 5–7, 6–2, [10–5]

References

External links 
 Official website

2022 WTA 125 tournaments
2022 in Croatian tennis
Makarska International Championships
Croatian Bol Ladies Open
May 2022 sports events in Croatia
June 2022 sports events in Croatia